Gorenje (in older sources also Gornja vas) is a settlement north of Kočevje in southern Slovenia. The area is part of the traditional region of Lower Carniola and is now included in the Southeast Slovenia Statistical Region. It includes the hamlets of Pri Studencu and Plumbirt.

Name
The name Gorenje is shared by several settlements in Slovenia. It arose through ellipsis of Gorenje selo (literally, 'upper village'), denoting the elevation of the place in relation to a neighboring settlement. Gorenje stands about  higher than the neighboring villages to the west.

Cultural heritage
A small late 19th-century chapel in the centre of the village is dedicated to Saint Joseph.

Gallery

References

External links

Gorenje on Geopedia
Pre–World War II map of Gorenje with oeconyms and family names

Populated places in the Municipality of Kočevje